Adolphus Dolo (born March 21, 1963) is a member of the Liberian Senate representing Nimba County.  He served an Army general during the presidency of Charles G. Taylor.

Senator Saye-Taayor A. Dolo is the junior senator for Nimba County. Also, he is the chairman person of the statutory committee, Internal Affairs, Governance and Reconciliation.

References 

1963 births
Members of the Senate of Liberia
People from Nimba County
Living people